Hibbertia stirlingii is a species of flowering plant in the family Dilleniaceae and is endemic to far northern Queensland. It is a small shrub with linear leaves and yellow flowers arranged singly near the ends of branches, with ten to twelve stamens arranged in bundles around two densely scaly carpels.

Description
Flowering occurs from January to June

Taxonomy
Hibbertia stirlingii was first formally described in 1936 by Cyril Tenison White in the Proceedings of the Royal Society of Queensland from specimens collected by James Stirling near Herberton in 1904.

Distribution and habitat
This hibbertia grows on coarse, sandy soil in woodland or forest in far north Queensland.

Conservation status
Hibbertia stirlingii is classified as of "least concern" under the Queensland Government Nature Conservation Act 1992.

See also
List of Hibbertia species

References

stirlingii
Flora of Queensland
Plants described in 1936
Taxa named by Cyril Tenison White